Cardillac is a 1969 West German drama film directed by Edgar Reitz, starring Hans-Christian Blech and Catana Cayetano. It tells the story of a goldsmith who is so obsessed with his own craft that he murders his customers. The film is a modern adaptation of E. T. A. Hoffmann's novella Mademoiselle de Scuderi.

(Composer Paul Hindemith also used the novella as the basis of his 1926 opera Cardillac.)

Cast
 Hans Christian Blech as Cardillac
 Catana Cayetano as Madelon
 Rolf Becker as Olivier
 Liane Hielscher as Liane S.
 Werner Leschhorn as Albert von Boysen
 Gunter Sachs as Kunstsammler

Release
The film premiered on 28 August 1969 at the 30th Venice International Film Festival. It was released in West Germany on 1 March 1970.

References

External links
 

1969 films
1960s avant-garde and experimental films
German avant-garde and experimental films
West German films
Films directed by Edgar Reitz
1960s German-language films
Films based on German novels
Films about race and ethnicity
1960s German films